Chick Henderson  may refer to:

 Chick Henderson (rugby union) (1930–2006), South African rugby union footballer and commentator
 Chick Henderson (singer) (1912–1944), English singer